was a Japanese domain of the Edo period, located in Shima Province (part of modern-day Mie Prefecture), Japan. It was centered on Toba Castle in what is now the city of Toba.

History
During the Sengoku period, most of Shima Province came under the control of Kuki Yoshitaka, a retainer of Oda Nobunaga, who had a fleet of armored ships and controlled maritime traffic around Ise Bay. The Kuki clan fought on both sides during the Battle of Sekigahara, with Kuki Yoshitaka siding with the western forces loyal to Toyotomi Hideyori, and his son Kuki Moritaka, joining the eastern armies of Tokugawa Ieyasu. With the establishment of the Tokugawa shogunate, Kuki Moritaka was confirmed as daimyō of Toba, initially with a kokudaka of 35,000 koku, growing to 55,000 koku under his son Kuki Hisataka, who was transferred to Sanda Domain in Settsu Province in 1632.

The Kuki were replaced by a cadet branch of the Naitō clan, which ruled Toba until Naito Tadakatsu was forced to commit seppuku after killing fellow daimyō Nagai Naonaga in 1680. The domain then reverted to tenryō status under the direct control of the shogunate several months before it was reassigned to the Doi clan (1681–1691), Ogyu-Matsudaira clan (1691–1710), Itakura clan (1710–1717), and Toda-Matsudaira clan (1717–1725) before finally coming under the Inagaki clan (1725–1871), where it remained until the Meiji Restoration.

During the Boshin War, the domain remained loyal to the Shogunate and its forces fought in the Tokugawa army during the Battle of Toba-Fushimi. However, daimyō Inagaki Nagayuki was underage, and remained in Edo during the battle. After the Tokugawa defeat, the domain defected to the Imperial side, and as a result was fined heavily by the Meiji government. Inagaki Nagayuki was forced into retirement. His son, Inagaki Nagahiro became domain governor, and after the abolition of the han system in July 1871, Toba Domain became "Toba Prefecture", which merged with the short-lived "Watarai Prefecture" in November 1871, which later became part of Mie Prefecture.

Bakumatsu period holdings
As with most domains in the han system, Toba Domain consisted of several discontinuous territories calculated to provide the assigned kokudaka, based on periodic cadastral surveys and projected agricultural yields. 

Shima Province 
 37 villages in Tōshi District
 19 villages in Ago District
Ise Province
8 villages in Iino District
4 villages in Taki District
5 villages in Watarai District

List of daimyō

References
The content of this article was largely derived from that of the corresponding article on Japanese Wikipedia.

*
 Toba on "Edo 300 HTML"

Notes

Domains of Japan
1871 disestablishments in Japan
Domains of Mie Prefecture
Itakura clan
Naitō clan
Ogyū-Matsudaira clan
Toda-Matsudaira clan